List of bridges in Portland may refer to:

 List of bridges in Portland, Oregon
 List of bridges in Portland, Maine